The Snowy Mountains Scheme, also known as the Snowy Hydro or the Snowy scheme, is a hydroelectricity and irrigation complex in south-east Australia, Near the border of NSW and Victoria (Australia). The Scheme was completed under the supervision of Chief Engineer, Sir William Hudson. It is the largest engineering project undertaken in Australia.

The water of the Snowy River and some of its tributaries, much of which formerly flowed southeast onto the river flats of East Gippsland, and into Bass Strait of the Tasman sea, is captured at high elevations and diverted inland to the Murray and Murrumbidgee Rivers irrigation areas. The Scheme includes two major tunnel systems constructed through the continental divide of the Snowy Mountains, known in Australia as the Great Dividing Range. The water falls  and travels through large hydro-electric power stations which generate peak-load power for the Australian Capital Territory, New South Wales and Victoria.

In 2016, the Snowy Mountains Scheme was added to the Australian National Heritage List.

History

Background
Since the 1800s, both the Murray and Murrumbidgee rivers have been subject to development and control to meet water supply and irrigation needs. By contrast, the Snowy River, that rises in the Australian Alps and flows through mountainous and practically uninhabited country until debouching onto the river flats of East Gippsland, had never been controlled in any way, neither for the production of power nor for irrigation.  A great proportion of its waters flowed eastwards into the South Pacific Ocean (the Tasman Sea). The Snowy River has the highest headwater source of any in Australia and draws away a large proportion of the waters from the south-eastern New South Wales snowfields.  The construction of the Snowy Mountains Scheme was seen as a means of supplementing the flow of the great inland rivers, a means for developing hydro-electric power, and also a way to increase agricultural production in the Murray and Murrumbidgee valleys.

Following World War II, the Government of New South Wales proposed that the flow of the Snowy River be diverted into the Murrumbidgee River for irrigation and agricultural purposes. There was little emphasis placed on the generation of power. A counter proposal by the Government of Victoria involved a greater generation of power, and involved diversion of the Snowy River to the Murray River. Additionally, the Government of South Australia was concerned that downstream flows on the Murray River would be severely jeopardised.

The Commonwealth Government, looking at the national implications of the two proposals, initiated a meeting to discuss the use of the waters of the Snowy River, and a Committee was set up in 1946 to examine the question on the broadest possible basis. This Committee, in a report submitted in November 1948, suggested consideration of a far greater scheme than any previously put forward. It involved not only the simple question of use of the waters of the Snowy River, but consideration of the possible diversion of a number of rivers in the area, tributaries, not only of the Snowy, but of the Murray and Murrumbidgee. The recommendations of the Committee were generally agreed to by a conference of Ministers representing the Commonwealth, New South Wales, and Victoria, and it was also agreed that the Committee should continue its investigations.

However, limitations in the Australian Constitution meant that the Commonwealth Government was limited in the powers it could exercise, without the agreement of the States. Subsequently, the Commonwealth Government introduced legislation into the Federal Parliament under its defence power; and enacted the  that enabled the formation of the Snowy Mountains Hydroelectric Authority. Ten years later, the relevant States and Territories introduced their own corresponding legislation and in January 1959 the Snowy Mountains Agreement was reached between the Commonwealth and the States.

The legislation created the Snowy Mountains Hydroelectric Authority that was given responsibility for the final evaluation, design and construction of the Snowy Mountains Scheme.  The final agreed plan was to divert the waters of the Snowy Mountains region to provide increased electricity generating capacity and to provide irrigation water for the dry west. It was "greeted with enthusiasm by the people of Australia" and was seen to be "a milestone towards full national development".

The chief engineer, New Zealand-born William Hudson (knighted 1955), was chosen to head the scheme as Chairman of the Snowy Mountains Hydroelectric Authority, and was instructed to seek workers from overseas. Hudson's employment of workers from 32 (mostly European) countries, many of whom had been at war with each other only a few years earlier, had a significant effect on the cultural mix of Australia.

Construction 

Construction of the Snowy Scheme was managed by the Snowy Mountains Hydroelectric Authority. It officially began on 17 October 1949 and took 25 years, being officially completed in 1974.

An agreement between the United States Bureau of Reclamation and Snowy Mountains Hydro to provide technical assistance and training of engineers was agreed between the United States and Australia in Washington, D.C. on 16 November 1951. A loan for $100 million was obtained from the World Bank in 1962.

Tunneling records were set in the construction of the Scheme and it was completed on time and on budget in 1974, at a cost of 820 million; a dollar value equivalent in 1999 and 2004 to A$6 billion. Around two thirds of the workforce employed in the construction of the scheme were immigrant workers, originating from over thirty countries. The official death toll of workers on the Scheme stands at 121 people. Just 2% of the construction work is visible from above ground.

Two of the towns constructed for the scheme are now permanent; Cabramurra, the highest town in Australia; and Khancoban. Cooma flourished during construction of the Scheme and remains the headquarters of the operating company of the Scheme. Townships at Adaminaby, Jindabyne and Talbingo were inundated by the flooded waters from Lake Eucumbene, Lake Jindabyne and Jounama Reservoir. Improved vehicular access to the high country enabled ski-resort villages to be constructed at Thredbo and Guthega in the 1950s by former Snowy Scheme workers who realised the potential for expansion of the Australian ski industry.

The design of the scheme was modelled on that of the Tennessee Valley Authority. Over 100,000 people from over 30 countries were employed during its construction, providing employment for many recently arrived immigrants, and was important in Australia's post-war economic and social development. Seventy percent of all the workers were migrants. During construction of the tunnels, a number of railways were employed to convey spoil from worksites and to deliver personnel, concrete and equipment throughout.

The project used Australia's first transistorised computer; one of the first in the world. Called 'Snowcom', the computer was used from 1960 to 1967.

At the completion of the project, the Australian Government maintained much of the diverse workforce and established the Snowy Mountains Engineering Corporation (SMEC), which is now an international engineering consultancy company. The Scheme is the largest renewable energy generator in mainland Australia and plays an important role in the operation of the National Electricity Market, generating approximately 67% of all renewable energy in the mainland National Electricity Market. The Snowy Scheme's primary function is as a water manager, however under the corporatised model must deliver dollar dividends to the three shareholder governments - the NSW, Commonwealth and Victorian Governments.

The Scheme also has a significant role in providing security of water flows to the Murray-Darling Basin.

The Snowy Mountains Hydro-electric Scheme, is one of the most complex integrated water and hydro-electric power schemes in the world and is listed as a "world-class civil engineering project" by the American Society of Civil Engineers. The history of the Snowy Scheme reveals its important role in building post World War II Australia.

Sir William Hudson was appointed the first commissioner of the Snowy Mountains Hydroelectric Authority, serving between 1949 and 1967. The Commissioner's role was the overall management of the Scheme. He represented the Scheme at the highest levels of government, welcomed international scientists and engineers, encouraged scientific and engineering research, as well as attending many social and civic activities. Sir William's management style 'stressed cooperation between management and labour and scientific knowledge (facts) over opinion'.

The Scheme was completed with the official opening of the Tumut 3 Power Station project by the Governor-General of Australia, Sir Paul Hasluck  on 21 October 1972.

Safety

The Scheme used a number of innovative approaches to all sorts of things during its construction. For example all vehicles driven on all parts of the scheme were required to be fitted with seatbelts for driver and front seat passenger; and that these seatbelts were required to be used.

On 16 April 1958, an elevator at a dam near Cabramurra fell about 400 feet when the cable broke, killing 4 Italian employees of a French construction firm.

Personal stories and memoirs of work on the Snowy Scheme 
Various stories and memoirs have been written about work on the Snowy Mountains Scheme. Siobhan McHugh's social history, The Snowy: The People Behind the Power is the most prominent, having been awarded the NSW Premier's Literary Award for Non-Fiction and being the source of an ABC radio documentary series (1987) and a Film Australia documentary, Snowy, A Dream of Growing Up (1989). Her book is based on about 90 oral histories with former Snowy workers and residents, with original recordings archived as a research collection at the State Library of New South Wales. An updated 70th anniversary edition of her book was published by New South in 2019 and its content showcased by Richard Fidler in an interview with McHugh for his popular ABC podcast, Conversations. Most recently, Snowy Hydro, Woden Community Service, Gen S Stories and PhotoAccess partnered for a Digital Storytelling project to present a diverse collection of stories told from the point of view of seven ex-workers, two lifelong employees and a child of a Snowy worker.

As part of the project, participants created short films about their experience on the Snowy Scheme, each story offering a unique perspective into what life was like building the Scheme between 1949 and 1974. The project's artistic director Jenni Savigny assisted participants to make the short films; enabling them to put together the scripts, record voice overs and edit the short films. In an interview with Andrew Brown (The Canberra Times), Savigny said it was important to create a history of the Snowy Hydro using the participant's own words, "You just get a personal sense of what it was like to be there, and what it meant to people's lives."

The films premiered 7 June 2018 at the Palace Electric Cinema in New Acton in Canberra and can be viewed on the Woden Community Service YouTube Channel.

Current operations 

There is currently further work ongoing for the expansion of the snowy scheme under the Snowy scheme 2.0 announced in 2017. Despite government support it has revived many criticisms and concerns over the logistical and financial feasibility of the operation.

Environmental concerns

The original plan was for 99% of the water of the Snowy River's natural flow to be diverted by the Scheme below Lake Jindabyne. Releases from the Scheme were based on the needs of riparian users only and took no account of the ecosystem's needs. It soon became clear that there were major environmental problems in the lower reaches of the Snowy river. An extensive public campaign led to the Snowy Water Inquiry being established in January 1998. The Inquiry reported to the New South Wales and Victorian Governments in October of that year, recommending an increase to 15% of natural flows. The two governments were equivocal about this target. Aside from economic considerations, there was a view that the health of the Murray was more important than that of the Snowy and that any extra environmental flows were better used there instead.

In the 1999 Victorian state election, the seat of Gippsland East was won by Craig Ingram, an independent and member of the Snowy River Alliance, based in large part on his campaign to improve Snowy flows. In 2000, Victoria and NSW agreed to a long-term target of 28%, requiring A$156 million of investment to offset losses to inland irrigators. In August 2002 flows were increased to 6%, with a target of 21% within 10 years. However, by October 2008 it was evident that the return of environmental flows to the Snowy River in 2009 would be no more than 4% of natural flow with governments arguing the Snowy River needs to "pay back" the "Mowamba Borrowings". At the 2010 state election, Ingram lost the seat of Gippsland East to the Nationals.

In 2017, it was announced that the 21% target would be reached for the first time.

Some concerned water managers, conservationists, politicians and farmers continue to advocate for the return of environmental flows to the Snowy River. The Snowy River Alliance formed in 1996 to address the lack of environmental flow commemorates Snowy River Day annually, towards the end of August, to mark the 2002 anniversary of when the governments of Victoria, NSW and the Commonwealth first released water into the Snowy River over the Mowamba Weir.
The Dalgety District and Community Association started in response to dirty drinking water for the town of Dalgety, the loss of fishing and looming closure of the caravan park. A weir was constructed at Dalgety and the caravan park stayed as a result of their efforts.
In accordance with the Snowy Water Licence, Snowy Hydro Limited has 're-commissioned' the Mowamba Aqueduct. Seasonal variable flows are essential to river ecology including flushing flows to support vital ecosystems for the Australian platypus and native Australian Bass, the species over which Ingram initially fought for flows into the Snowy River. A major spillway upgrade now facilitates these flows.

Components
Construction of the Scheme began in 1949 and was completed in 1974. Guthega power station commenced power production on 21 February 1955.

Power stations

Major dams and reservoirs 
The Scheme's largest dam is Talbingo Dam with an embankment volume of 14 488 000 m3 and a wall height of 161.5 meters. A variety of dam and spillway types were used in the construction.

At the other end of the scale, Deep Creek Reservoir is the smallest reservoir with just .

Tunnels

Pumping Stations 
The Snowy Mountains Scheme has two pumping stations. The 600 MW pump storage facility at Tumut 3 Power Station returns water to Talbingo Reservoir. The 1 MW Jindabyne Pumping Station pumps water from Lake Jindabyne through to the Snowy-Geehi Tunnel at Island Bend.

Expansion plans 
In March 2017, the Australian government then headed by Malcolm Turnbull suggested a $2 billion project expanding the 4.1 GW Snowy Mountains Scheme by 2 GW of pump storage for a week, building new tunnels and power stations, but no new dams. The 80% efficiency of such storage can be sufficient in leveling differences between supply and demand. Dubbed , the expansion has been under construction since 2019 and is due to complete by 2026.

Tourism
The Snowy Scheme is a major tourist destination. Sightseeing driving tours to the key locations of the Scheme are popular out of regional centres like Cooma, Adaminaby and  Jindabyne along roads built for the Scheme like the Snowy Mountains Highway and Alpine Way and towards sights like Cabramurra, as Australia's highest town, spectacular dam walls, and scenic lakes. Trout fishing is popular in the lakes of the Scheme, notably Lake Jindabyne and Lake Eucumbene.

The Snowy Scheme Museum opened at Adaminaby in 2011 to profile the history of the Scheme.

Though skiing in Australia began in the northern Snowy Mountains in the 1860s, it was the construction of the vast Snowy Scheme from 1949, with its improvements to infrastructure and influx of experienced European skiers among the workers on the Scheme, that really opened up the mountains for the large scale development of a ski industry, and led to the establishment of Thredbo and Perisher as leading Australian resorts. The construction of Guthega Dam brought skiers to the isolated Guthega district and a rope tow was installed there in 1957. Charles Anton, a snowy worker identified the potential of the Thredbo Valley.

Engineering heritage award 
The scheme is listed as a National Engineering Landmark by Engineers Australia as part of its Engineering Heritage Recognition Program.

See also

 Snowy A 1990s TV series starring Rebecca Gibney set in the scheme.
 Bradfield Scheme, a similar proposal for Queensland
 Economic history of Australia
 National Electricity Market
 Kiewa Hydroelectric Scheme

References

External links

 
 
 
 Snowy Hydro Limited
 
 
 
 The Snowy River Alliance — a community group for the protection of the Snowy River

Further reading
 
 
 
 

 
Adaminaby
Australian National Heritage List
Economic history of New South Wales
Engineering projects
Historic Civil Engineering Landmarks
History of Australia (1945–present)
Hydroelectric power stations in New South Wales
Interbasin transfer
Murray River
River regulation in Australia
Scheme
Snowy River
Water management in New South Wales
1940s in New South Wales
1950s in New South Wales
1960s in New South Wales
1970s in New South Wales
1949 establishments in Australia
Infrastructure completed in 1972
1972 establishments in Australia
20th century in New South Wales
Recipients of Engineers Australia engineering heritage markers